The Battle for Pikes Peak is a college ice hockey rivalry series that is played between the Colorado College Tigers and the Air Force Falcons.

Background
The two schools have played each other since the  Air Force Academy introduced ice hockey to its sporting schedule in the 1968–69 season.  Colorado College started its hockey program thirty years before in 1938 and had been the lone top tier college hockey team till the University of Denver added ice hockey in 1949. The rivalry between Colorado College and the University of Denver, commonly called the Battle for the Gold Pan, has had a far more reaching intensity and history. However, unlike CC and DU, who are 65 miles from each other, CC and the Air Force Academy are only 11 miles apart, with CC within the Colorado Springs city limits and the AFA adjacent to the city limits (with a very small portion within the city). In 2013, Colorado College and Air Force established the Pikes Peak Trophy in memory of former CC and Falcons head coach John Matchefts. Matchefts had compiled a record of 54-88-3 in five seasons (1966-71) at the Colorado College helm before posting a ledger of 154-150-6 in 11 years (1974-85) with Air Force.

The rules to the series are very similar to that of the more widely known Battle for the Gold Pan. There are however many distinct differences. Unlike the four games per year between CC and DU, Air Force and CC have traditionally played only two games per year (between 2011 and 2014 only one game was played), this is mostly done in part as Air Force and CC have never been in the same conference. Air Force is currently part of the Atlantic Hockey Association, while Colorado College is a founding member of both its former and current hockey leagues, respectively the Western Collegiate Hockey Association and National Collegiate Hockey Conference. Both play a home-and-home series on weekends, where both teams play on each other's home ice on back-to-back nights. As of the upcoming 2022–23 season, CC plays its home games at Ed Robson Arena, while Air Force's home ice is Cadet Ice Arena. Both arenas feature NHL-sized rinks, in contrast to CC's former home of Broadmoor World Arena, with a larger Olympic-sized rink. Before Robson Arena opened in 2021–22, the difference in rink size was again similar to that of the rivalry between CC and DU. The setup is that the winner of the series wins the Pikes Peak Trophy. If a tie is reached then the trophy is retained by the previous winner. In the 2016/17 season both schools faced off again for only one game in the regular season. In the 2019-20 season, the teams faced off twice in a season for the first time in four seasons.

Overall rivalry record
The following table details the game results since the inaugural 1969 meeting.

Goal count

Updated as of November 26, 2016

Head-to-head tally

As of November 2016

See also
Battle for the Gold Pan

References

Air Force Falcons ice hockey
College ice hockey rivalries in the United States
Colorado College Tigers men's ice hockey
Ice hockey teams in Colorado
1969 establishments in Colorado